In molecular biology, ghrelin opposite strand (non-protein coding), also known as GHRLOS, is a long non-coding RNA. It is antisense to the GHRL gene, which encodes ghrelin. In humans, it is located on chromosome 3p25. It is alternatively spliced into multiple isoforms.

See also
 Long noncoding RNA

References

Non-coding RNA